Brock Edward Lesnar (born July 12, 1977) is an American-Canadian professional wrestler and former mixed martial artist, amateur wrestler, and professional American football player. He is currently signed to WWE, where he performs on both the Raw and SmackDown brands. Often regarded as one of the most prolific athletes in the world, Lesnar is the only person to have won all of the primary heavyweight championships in WWE, Ultimate Fighting Championship (UFC),  New Japan Pro-Wrestling (NJPW), and the National Collegiate Athletic Association (NCAA).

Lesnar competed in collegiate wrestling for the University of Minnesota, winning the NCAA Division I national championship in 2000. He soon signed with the World Wrestling Federation (WWF, renamed WWE in 2002), rising to industry prominence in 2002 by winning the WWE Championship at age 25, setting the record for the youngest performer to win the championship. In 2004, Lesnar departed WWE to join the Minnesota Vikings of the National Football League (NFL), but was cut from the team during pre-season. He returned to pro-wrestling and signed with NJPW in 2005 where he won the IWGP Heavyweight Championship. Years later in 2012, he re-signed with WWE; his 504-day first reign with the WWE Universal Championship is the seventh-longest world championship reign in the promotion's history and he holds the record for most reigns as Universal Champion at three. He also won the Royal Rumble match twice (2003 and 2022), the Money in the Bank ladder match (2019), the King of the Ring tournament (2002), and has headlined several pay-per-view events, including WWE's flagship event WrestleMania five times (XIX, 31, 34, 36, and 38); in addition, he also ended The Undertaker's undefeated WrestleMania streak in 2014.

Lesnar began an MMA career in 2007, and signed with the UFC in 2008. He quickly won the UFC Heavyweight Championship, but was sidelined with diverticulitis in 2009. On his return in 2010, Lesnar defeated Interim UFC Heavyweight Champion Shane Carwin to unify the heavyweight championships and become the undisputed UFC Heavyweight Champion. After a set of losses and further struggles with diverticulitis, Lesnar retired from MMA in 2011. He returned at UFC 200 in 2016 to defeat Mark Hunt, but his victory was overturned to a no-contest after he tested positive for clomiphene, a banned substance on UFC's anti-doping policy. He then retired from MMA for the second time in 2017. A box office sensation, he competed in some of the bestselling pay-per-view events in promotion history, including headlining UFC 91, UFC 100, UFC 116, and UFC 121. He also co-headlined UFC 200, briefly being the main headliner before that spot was given to Amanda Nunes vs. Miesha Tate.

Early life 
Brock Edward Lesnar was born in Webster, South Dakota, on July 12, 1977, the son of Stephanie and Richard Lesnar. He is of German descent, and grew up on his parents' dairy farm in Webster. He has two older brothers named Troy and Chad, and a younger sister named Brandi. At the age of 17, he joined the Army National Guard and was assigned to an office job after his red-green colorblindness was deemed hazardous to his desire to work with explosives. He was discharged after failing a computer typing test and later worked for a construction company.

Amateur wrestling 
Lesnar attended Webster High School, playing football and competing in amateur wrestling, placing third in the state championships his senior year. He then went to Bismarck State College, where he won the National Junior College Athletic Association (NJCAA) heavyweight wrestling championship in his sophomore year. Lesnar attended Bismarck State College for two years before transferring to the University of Minnesota on a wrestling scholarship, where he was roommates with future WWE colleague Shelton Benjamin, who was also his assistant coach.

Lesnar won the 2000 National Collegiate Athletic Association (NCAA) Division I heavyweight wrestling championship his senior year after being the runner-up to Stephen Neal the year prior. He finished his amateur career as a two-time NJCAA All-American, the 1998 NJCAA Heavyweight Champion, two-time NCAA All-American, two-time Big Ten Conference Champion and the 2000 NCAA Heavyweight Champion, with a record of 106–5 overall in four years of college.

Professional wrestling career

World Wrestling Federation/Entertainment

Ohio Valley Wrestling (2000–2001) 
In 2000, Lesnar signed with the World Wrestling Federation (WWF) and was sent to its developmental territory Ohio Valley Wrestling (OVW), where he first met future friend and manager Paul Heyman. OVW booker Jim Cornette paired Lesnar with his former college roommate Shelton Benjamin in October 2000. They were known as The Minnesota Stretching Crew and won the OVW Southern Tag Team Championship on three separate occasions. Lesnar wrestled several dark matches in 2001 and 2002 before being called up to the WWF's main roster.

The Next Big Thing (2002–2003) 
Lesnar debuted on WWF television on the March 18, 2002, episode of Raw as a heel, attacking Al Snow, Maven and Spike Dudley during their WWF Hardcore Championship match, while also being accompanied by Paul Heyman, who was seen giving instructions to Lesnar. When the brand extension was introduced in the WWF, Lesnar was drafted to the Raw brand. Later, Heyman was confirmed to be Lesnar's agent and gave Lesnar the nickname "The Next Big Thing". Lesnar's first feud was with The Hardy Boyz. He defeated Jeff Hardy by knockout after Hardy did not respond to referee Theodore Long at Backlash on April 21, his first official televised match. The next night on Raw, Lesnar faced off against Jeff's brother, Matt Hardy, and defeated him in the same fashion. Lesnar and Shawn Stasiak lost to The Hardy Boyz at Insurrextion on May 4 after Stasiak was pinned, but Lesnar attacked all the participants after the match. At Judgment Day on May 19, Lesnar and Heyman defeated The Hardy Boyz. This was also the first pay-per-view held after the WWF was renamed to World Wrestling Entertainment (WWE).

In June 2002, Lesnar won the 2002 King of the Ring tournament, defeating Bubba Ray Dudley in the first round, Booker T in the quarter-finals, Test in the semi-finals and Rob Van Dam in the finals, earning him a shot at the WWE Undisputed Championship at SummerSlam. At Vengeance on July 21, Lesnar lost to Van Dam in a WWE Intercontinental Championship match by disqualification. On July 22, Lesnar joined the SmackDown! brand. After a quick feud with Hollywood Hulk Hogan in August 2002, Lesnar defeated The Rock at SummerSlam on August 25 to become the new WWE Undisputed Champion and youngest WWE Champion at age 25. He also became the second fastest professional wrestler to win the WWE Championship since his debut (126 days) behind only Ric Flair (113 days). At the time, the WWE Undisputed Championship was being defended on both brands, so Raw General Manager Eric Bischoff expected Lesnar to return on Raw the following night. SmackDown! General Manager Stephanie McMahon declared that Lesnar was only required to defend the title on SmackDown! shows and events, prompting Bischoff to establish a new championship for the Raw brand (the World Heavyweight Championship); the WWE Undisputed Championship was then renamed the WWE Championship.

Lesnar's rapid rise to the top of WWE in 2002 led to a feud with The Undertaker, which involved a match at Unforgiven on September 22. The match ended in a double disqualification, with Lesnar retained the title. Lesnar faced The Undertaker again at No Mercy, this time in a Hell in a Cell match. Leading up to the match, in the storyline, Lesnar broke The Undertaker's hand with a propane tank. Despite Heyman begging McMahon not to let The Undertaker use his cast as a weapon, the request was denied and the match went on as planned. At No Mercy on October 20, Lesnar defeated The Undertaker in the Hell in a Cell match to retain the title, thus ending their feud. He retained the WWE Championship in a handicap match with Heyman against Edge at Rebellion on October 26.

Lesnar's next opponent was Big Show and Heyman was convinced more than anyone that Lesnar could not win, trying to talk him out of defending the title. Lesnar refused and defended the championship against Big Show at Survivor Series on November 17. At Survivor Series, Heyman turned on Lesnar, allowing Big Show to chokeslam him onto a steel chair and pin him to win the WWE Championship, resulting in Lesnar's first pinfall loss in WWE. This led to Lesnar turning face for the first time. Following Survivor Series, Heyman made it clear that Lesnar would not get a rematch, and had snuck a special clause saying so into his contract. To gain his revenge on Big Show and Heyman, Lesnar interfered in Big Show's first title defense, which came against Kurt Angle the next month at Armageddon on December 15, where Lesnar executed the F-5 on Big Show, which enabled Angle to win the WWE Championship. On the following episode of SmackDown!, Angle introduced Heyman as his manager and, despite promising Lesnar a title shot earlier in the evening, declared that Lesnar still would not get it. Lesnar's rivalry with Heyman and Big Show resumed, which culminated in a match at the Royal Rumble on January 19, 2003, with the winner being placed into the Royal Rumble match later in the evening. At the Royal Rumble, he defeated Big Show and entered the Royal Rumble match as the #29 entry. He eliminated Matt Hardy and Team Angle (Charlie Haas and Lesnar's former OVW teammate Shelton Benjamin), who at the time, were mentored by Angle as a three-man stable. He eliminated The Undertaker last and won the Royal Rumble match, which guaranteed him a WWE Championship match at WrestleMania XIX since he was a SmackDown! wrestler. After the Royal Rumble, Lesnar and Chris Benoit defeated Angle, Haas and Benjamin in a three-on-two handicap match at No Way Out on February 23, despite Team Angle injuring their partner, Edge, backstage before the match. At WrestleMania on March 30, Lesnar defeated Angle to win his second WWE Championship; during the match, he botched a shooting star press (a move he had used numerous times in OVW) and landed on his head and neck, resulting in a concussion. This forced Angle (who entered the match with a broken neck) and Lesnar to improvise the finish of the match.

WWE Champion, various feuds and departure (2003–2004) 
After WrestleMania, Lesnar turned his attention to John Cena, who had returned from injury in February 2003 after an F-5 into a ringpost from Lesnar, with Cena claiming that Lesnar nearly ended his career and even named his new finishing move the "F.U." as a jab at the new champion. The feud ended in a match at Backlash on April 27, where Lesnar defeated Cena to retain the WWE Championship. On the following episode of SmackDown!, Lesnar resumed his rivalry with Big Show after, in the storyline, Big Show injured Rey Mysterio during their match at Backlash. Big Show's attack resulted in Mysterio being carried out on a stretcher and backboard, and Big Show took Mysterio off the stretcher and swung the backboard into the ringpost, compounding the injury. Lesnar called out Big Show, who demanded that Lesnar put his title on the line against him. This led to a stretcher match for the WWE Championship at Judgment Day on May 18, which Lesnar won. During a rematch on the June 12 episode of SmackDown!, Lesnar lifted Big Show off the top-rope in a superplex which caused the ring to collapse on impact. As Lesnar and Big Show continued their rivalry, Kurt Angle returned from his neck surgery and began to form a more friendly rivalry with Lesnar, as the two were allies, yet contenders for the title. At the first-ever SmackDown! brand-exclusive pay-per-view on July 27, Vengeance, Lesnar lost the WWE Championship to Angle in a triple threat match involving Big Show, after he was pinned by Angle.

Lesnar continued to aggressively pursue the WWE Championship despite his friendship with Angle. Mr. McMahon became involved in the angle, at first berating Lesnar, who had involved himself in McMahon's rivalry with Zach Gowen, for losing to Angle. This all turned out to be a swerve that came into focus on the August 7 episode of SmackDown!. That night, Lesnar and McMahon were to face each other in a steel cage match with Angle as the special guest referee as per McMahon's orders on the previous week's program. During the match, Lesnar had passed out due to a staged backstage incident and McMahon was set to pin him, but Angle refused to allow McMahon to win that way. As the two men began to argue, Lesnar attacked Angle with an F-5 and kept attacking Angle while McMahon watched and celebrated with him afterward, turning heel once again in the process. At SummerSlam on August 24, Lesnar lost to Angle after submitting to the ankle lock. On the September 18 episode of SmackDown!, Lesnar defeated Angle in an Iron Man match to win his third WWE Championship by a final score of five to four, thus ending their long-standing feud.

Lesnar successfully defended his newly won title against the debuting Paul London on the October 9 episode of SmackDown!. He returned to feud with The Undertaker, as Lesnar had previously cost Undertaker the title in a match against then-champion Kurt Angle on the September 4 episode of SmackDown!, which granted him a shot at Lesnar's title. At No Mercy on October 19, Lesnar defeated Undertaker in a Biker Chain match after interference from The Full Blooded Italians and Vince McMahon. After Paul Heyman returned to WWE as SmackDown! General Manager, Lesnar aligned himself with Heyman. With Survivor Series coming up, he challenged Angle to a traditional Survivor Series elimination tag team match. Lesnar chose Big Show as his first teammate, with Heyman adding a returning Nathan Jones and a debuting Matt Morgan to bring the team number to four. Angle chose Chris Benoit and The APA (Bradshaw and Faarooq) to join his team. Faarooq was injured during a match with Lesnar and Angle's team was forced to find a replacement for him. Lesnar's team picked A-Train to fill the fifth and final spot for them after he attacked John Cena, who refused to accept an invitation to join Lesnar's team. Cena instead joined Angle's team and Angle added Hardcore Holly as the fifth member (Lesnar had legitimately injured Holly the year before and he had not wrestled since). On November 16 at Survivor Series, Lesnar was eliminated after Benoit forced him to tap out to the Crippler Crossface. His team lost the match. On the December 4 episode of SmackDown!, he defended the WWE Championship from Benoit after Benoit passed out to Lesnar's debuting submission hold, the Brock Lock.

Survivor Series in November 2003 also marked the first time Lesnar met Goldberg from the Raw brand. After Lesnar claimed in a backstage interview that he could beat anybody in the world, Goldberg interrupted the interview and introduced himself to Lesnar, shaking hands with him before leaving with a staredown. Lesnar followed this rivalry with a feud involving Hardcore Holly. In the storyline, Holly wanted revenge on Lesnar for legitimately injuring his neck during a previous match between the two in 2002 which left Holly in need of neck surgery and out of action for a year. At the Royal Rumble on January 25, 2004, Lesnar defeated Holly to retain the WWE Championship. Later in the Royal Rumble match, Lesnar attacked Goldberg with an F-5, enabling Kurt Angle to eliminate him by throwing him off the top rope.

Lesnar defended the WWE Championship against Eddie Guerrero at No Way Out on February 15. Goldberg attacked Lesnar with a spear while the referee was unconscious, allowing Guerrero to get a near-fall on Lesnar. Lesnar then attempted an F-5 on Guerrero but Guerrero reversed it into a DDT on the title belt and executed a frog splash to win the WWE Championship. An angry Lesnar then began feuding with Goldberg, blaming him for losing his title, and a match was set up between the two at WrestleMania XX on March 14. During the feud with Goldberg, Lesnar was also at odds with Stone Cold Steve Austin, who was shown suggesting to Goldberg that he attack Lesnar at No Way Out. After Lesnar attacked Austin on the February 23 episode of Raw and stole his four-wheeler, Austin was inserted as the special guest referee for the WrestleMania match. On the March 4 episode of SmackDown!, Lesnar defeated Hardcore Holly in his last match on a weekly WWE televised show until 2019. Behind the scenes, it was widely known that the match was Goldberg's last in WWE. Only a week before WrestleMania, rumors surfaced that Lesnar too was leaving WWE to pursue a career in the National Football League (NFL). As a result, Lesnar's match with Goldberg became a fiasco as the fans at Madison Square Garden jeered and heckled both of them vociferously. Goldberg defeated Lesnar after a Jackhammer and both men subsequently received Stone Cold Stunners from Austin. After WrestleMania XX, Lesnar left WWE, citing burnout, poor creative decisions, an addiction to alcohol and painkillers and the rigorous travel schedule as reasons for his departure.

Japanese promotions (2005–2007) 
On October 8, 2005, Lesnar won the IWGP Heavyweight Championship on his debut match in a three-way match with Kazuyuki Fujita and Masahiro Chono at a New Japan Pro-Wrestling (NJPW) show in the Tokyo Dome. Lesnar is one of the few American wrestlers to have held this title. He won the match by pinning Chono after an F-5, which he had renamed the Verdict since WWE owns the trademark on the F-5 name. After the match, Lesnar stated that this name was referring to his lawsuit against WWE, who filed a motion for a temporary restraining order to prevent Lesnar from continuing to work with NJPW on December 6, but the court did not grant it. Following that, he had two non-title victories against Manabu Nakanishi and Yuji Nagata. Lesnar successfully defended the championship on January 4, 2006, against former champion Shinsuke Nakamura. On January 13, WWE once again filed an injunction against Lesnar to stop him from defending the IWGP Heavyweight Championship, which was also not enforced as he went on to retain his championship against former Sumo Wrestling Grand Champion Akebono on March 19, at the Sumo Hall. Lesnar had another successful title defense against Giant Bernard on May 3. This was the first American vs. American title match in NJPW since Vader vs. Stan Hansen in 1990. On July 15, NJPW stripped Lesnar of the IWGP Heavyweight Championship as he did not return to defend it due to visa issues. A tournament was held on July 16 to determine the new champion, which was won by Hiroshi Tanahashi. Lesnar continued to possess the physical IWGP Heavyweight Championship belt until late June 2007.

Approximately one year later on June 29, 2007, Lesnar defended his IWGP Heavyweight Championship against TNA World Heavyweight Champion Kurt Angle in a champion vs. champion match, at the debut event of the Inoki Genome Federation (IGF). IGF promoter Antonio Inoki had stated Lesnar was the "proper" IWGP Heavyweight Champion as he was not defeated for the title. Angle made him tap out to the ankle lock to win the IWGP Heavyweight Championship as recognized by IGF and Total Nonstop Action Wrestling (TNA). This was Lesnar's last match as a professional wrestler until 2012, when he re-signed with WWE.

Return to WWE (2012-2020)

Return and ending The Streak (2012–2014) 

Lesnar returned to WWE on April 2, 2012, on Raw, as a heel, by confronting and delivering an F-5 to John Cena. The following week on Raw, General Manager John Laurinaitis revealed that he signed Lesnar to bring "legitimacy" back to WWE and become the "new face of the WWE". Laurinaitis also scheduled Lesnar to face Cena at Extreme Rules in an Extreme Rules match. At Extreme Rules on April 29, Lesnar lost to Cena despite dominating the match.

The following night on Raw, WWE's Chief Operating Officer Triple H refused to give in to Lesnar's unreasonable contract demands (which included being given his own personal jet and having Raw renamed to Monday Night Raw Starring Brock Lesnar), resulting in Lesnar attacking him and breaking his arm with a kimura lock in storyline. The next week on Raw, Paul Heyman returned as Lesnar's legal representative; he claimed that Lesnar was quitting WWE and was suing WWE for breach of contract. At No Way Out in June, Triple H challenged Lesnar (who was not present) to a match at SummerSlam, which Lesnar refused. Stephanie McMahon later goaded Heyman into accepting the match on Lesnar's behalf on July 23 at Raw 1000. At SummerSlam on August 19, Lesnar defeated Triple H by submission after once again breaking his arm in storyline. The following night on Raw, Lesnar declared himself the new "King of Kings" and said that he would depart from WWE after his victory over Triple H, stating that he had conquered everything in the company.

Lesnar returned on the January 28, 2013, episode of Raw, confronting Mr. McMahon who was about to fire Heyman, and despite Heyman's pleas, Lesnar attacked McMahon with an F-5, breaking McMahon's pelvis in storyline. The following week during The Miz's Miz TV talk show, Raw Managing Supervisor Vickie Guerrero revealed herself as the one who signed Lesnar to a new contract to impress McMahon. On the February 25 episode of Raw, Lesnar once again attempted to attack McMahon, only to get into a brawl with the returning Triple H, which resulted in Lesnar legitimately having his head split open and requiring eighteen stitches. The following week on Raw, Triple H issued a challenge to Lesnar, requesting a rematch with him at WrestleMania 29, which Lesnar accepted but only after Triple H signed a contract and Lesnar named the stipulation. After Triple H signed the contract and assaulted Heyman, the stipulation was revealed as No Holds Barred with Triple H's career on the line. At WrestleMania on April 7, Lesnar lost to Triple H after a Pedigree onto the steel steps. On the April 15 episode of Raw, Lesnar attacked 3MB (Heath Slater, Drew McIntyre, and Jinder Mahal) before Heyman challenged Triple H to face Lesnar in a steel cage match at Extreme Rules, which Triple H accepted the following week. At Extreme Rules on May 19, after interference from Heyman, Lesnar defeated Triple H to end their feud. Lesnar returned on the June 17 episode of Raw, attacking Heyman's fellow client CM Punk with an F-5. Despite the accusations from Punk, Heyman claimed that he was not behind Lesnar's attack on him. Heyman turned on Punk in July, and claimed that Punk could not beat Lesnar, which led to Lesnar making his return and attacking Punk on the July 15 episode of Raw. The following week on Raw, Punk challenged Lesnar to a match at SummerSlam on August 18, where Lesnar defeated Punk in a no disqualification match.

On the December 30 episode of Raw, Lesnar returned with Heyman to challenge the winner of the upcoming WWE World Heavyweight Championship match between Randy Orton and John Cena at the Royal Rumble. Lesnar then dared any wrestler who disapproved of that notion to challenge him, which was answered by Mark Henry. The ensuing brawl ended with Lesnar delivering an F-5 to Henry. The following week on Raw, Henry challenged Lesnar again, only to have Lesnar dislocate his elbow with the Kimura lock in storyline, which led Big Show to confront Lesnar, thus starting a feud which was settled at the Royal Rumble on January 26, 2014, where Lesnar defeated Big Show after attacking him with a steel chair before the match began. On the February 24 episode of Raw, Heyman stated that Lesnar had requested a match for the WWE World Heavyweight Championship at WrestleMania XXX, but received an open contract to face anyone else of his choosing instead. The Undertaker then returned and attacked Lesnar with a chokeslam through a table, setting up their match at WrestleMania XXX. At WrestleMania on April 6, Lesnar defeated Undertaker after executing three F-5s, ending his undefeated WrestleMania streak at 21, a feat that was described by Sports Illustrated as being "the most shocking result since the Montreal Screwjob".

WWE World Heavyweight Champion (2014–2015) 

At SummerSlam on August 17, Lesnar defeated John Cena to win the WWE World Heavyweight Championship; during the match he delivered sixteen suplexes (most of which were German suplexes) and two F-5s to Cena, who barely managed any offense. In a rematch at Night of Champions on September 21, Lesnar was disqualified due to Seth Rollins interfering, but retained his championship. Later in the year, Rollins reunited with The Authority and was added to Lesnar and Cena championship match at the Royal Rumble on January 25, 2015, making it a triple threat match, which Lesnar won despite (storyline) breaking a rib during the match.

Lesnar's next challenger was Roman Reigns, who had won the Royal Rumble match to earn a title match at WrestleMania 31 on March 29. During his main event match against Reigns, Lesnar delivered multiple suplexes and was heard exclaiming, "Suplex City, bitch!" and thereafter "Suplex City" became one of his signature catchphrases and merchandise motifs. After Lesnar and Reigns traded a few false finishes, Rollins cashed in his Money in the Bank contract while the match was in progress, making it a triple threat; Rollins then pinned Reigns to win the title after delivering a Curb Stomp. The following night on Raw, Lesnar tried to invoke his rematch clause and subsequently attacked commentators Booker T, John "Bradshaw" Layfield and Michael Cole, as well as a cameraman after Rollins refused the rematch, which led to Stephanie McMahon suspending Lesnar indefinitely in storyline.

Lesnar returned on the June 15 episode of Raw, being chosen by The Authority as the number one contender to Rollins' WWE World Heavyweight Championship at Battleground. On July 4, Lesnar made his first non-televised wrestling appearance for WWE since his 2012 return, defeating Kofi Kingston at The Beast in the East live event in Tokyo in a quick winning effort; he also delivered F-5s to Kingston's New Day stablemates Big E and Xavier Woods after the match. At Battleground on July 19, Lesnar dominated Rollins, delivering thirteen suplexes, but mid-pinfall, after performing an F-5, he was attacked by The Undertaker (who incapacitated Lesnar with a chokeslam and two Tombstone Piledrivers), thus ending the match with Lesnar winning by disqualification and Rollins retaining the championship.

Suplex City (2015–2017) 

The following night on Raw, Undertaker explained that he had attacked Lesnar not for ending his WrestleMania streak, but rather for Lesnar allowing Heyman to constantly taunt him about it, which led to the two brawling throughout the arena and a WrestleMania rematch being scheduled for SummerSlam on August 23, where Undertaker controversially defeated Lesnar. The timekeeper rang the bell as Undertaker had supposedly submitted to Lesnar's Kimura lock, though the referee had not seen any submission. In the ensuing confusion, Undertaker hit Lesnar with a low blow and applied his Hell's Gate submission hold, in which Lesnar passed out. The following night on Raw, Lesnar and Heyman challenged Undertaker to an immediate rematch, only to be confronted by Bo Dallas (who mocked Lesnar about his defeat); Lesnar responded with five German suplexes and an F-5.

At Hell in a Cell on October 25, Lesnar defeated Undertaker in a Hell in a Cell match after a low blow and F-5 onto the exposed ring floor, ending their feud. The match was later voted "Match of the Year" during the 2015 Slammy Awards.

On the January 11, 2016, episode of Raw, Lesnar returned, attacking The New Day, The League of Nations (Sheamus, King Barrett, Rusev and Alberto Del Rio) and Kevin Owens, before performing an F-5 on Roman Reigns. The following week on Raw, he brawled with Reigns until they were attacked by The Wyatt Family. At the Royal Rumble on January 24, Lesnar was the 23rd entrant, eliminating Jack Swagger and The Wyatt Family minus Bray Wyatt before being eliminated by the Wyatt Family members he had eliminated first. He later defeated Wyatt and Luke Harper in a two-on-one handicap at the Road Block pay-per-view event.

On the January 25 episode of Raw, Stephanie McMahon scheduled a triple threat match between Lesnar, Roman Reigns and Dean Ambrose for Fastlane to determine who would challenge Triple H's for the WWE World Heavyweight Championship at WrestleMania 32. In the following weeks, Lesnar was continuously provoked by Ambrose, with Reigns saving him from the subsequent attacks by Lesnar. At Fastlane on February 21, Lesnar dominated most of the match before he was put through two broadcast tables by Ambrose and Reigns; he lost the match after Reigns pinned Ambrose. Because of this, Lesnar attacked Ambrose in the parking lot as he was arriving at the arena. Ambrose returned later in the night, having hijacked an ambulance, and challenged Lesnar to a No Holds Barred Street Fight match at WrestleMania 32 on April 3, where Lesnar defeated Ambrose after an F-5 onto a pile of chairs.

On the July 7 episode of SmackDown, it Lesnar was revealed as the returning Randy Orton's opponent for SummerSlam. Two days later on July 9, WWE allowed Lesnar to have a one-off fight for UFC 200. Lesnar failed two of his drug tests for this fight but was not suspended by WWE because he is not a full-time performer. On July 19 at the 2016 WWE draft, Lesnar was the #5 draft pick for the Raw brand. Reports claimed that he would have been #1 had he not failed his UFC drug tests. Orton was drafted to SmackDown, thus making their match an interbrand match, while WWE billed their face-off as a match fifteen years in the making. Along with Heyman, Lesnar made his return to Raw on August 1 (his first appearance on WWE programming since WrestleMania 32), but during his segment Orton appeared and attacked Lesnar with an RKO. Lesnar then attacked Orton during his match the following night on SmackDown Live, performing an F-5 on Orton. At SummerSlam on August 21, Lesnar defeated Orton by technical knockout, leaving Orton with a forehead wound which required ten staples. He then hit Shane McMahon with an F-5. The end made many people believe Lesnar had gone off script due to the severity of Orton's head wound, out of which Vince McMahon confirmed that the ending was planned. Lesnar was later storyline fined $500 for delivering an F-5 to SmackDown Commissioner Shane McMahon and his assault on Orton. On September 24 at a house show in Chicago, Illinois, Lesnar defeated Orton in a no-disqualification rematch, with the match being billed as a Suplex City death match.

On the October 10 episode of Raw, Heyman, on Lesnar's behalf, challenged Goldberg to a fight after the pair had been feuding for several months through social media and during promotional work for the WWE 2K17 video game, which featured Lesnar as the cover star and Goldberg as the pre-order bonus. Heyman stated that Goldberg was the one blemish on Lesnar's WWE career, as Goldberg had defeated Lesnar at WrestleMania XX in 2004. On the October 17 episode of Raw, Goldberg returned to WWE after a twelve-year absence and accepted Lesnar's request for a fight with their match later scheduled for Survivor Series. On the final Raw before Survivor Series, Lesnar and Goldberg had a confrontation for the first time in twelve years, resulting in a brawl with security after Heyman insulted Goldberg's family. On November 20 at Survivor Series, Lesnar quickly lost to Goldberg in 1 minute and 26 seconds, marking the first time in three years that Lesnar was pinned. The next night on Raw, Goldberg declared himself the first entrant in the 2017 Royal Rumble match. The following week on Raw, Heyman addressed the Survivor Series match, stating that they underestimated Goldberg and that the match was a humiliation and embarrassment for him and Lesnar, who would also be in the Royal Rumble as he has something to prove. Lesnar returned on the January 16 episode of Raw to confront other Royal Rumble participants, attacking Sami Zayn, Seth Rollins, and Roman Reigns. At the Royal Rumble on January 29, Lesnar entered at number 26 and went on to eliminate Enzo Amore, Dean Ambrose and Dolph Ziggler before confronting Goldberg, who entered at number 28 and quickly eliminated Lesnar after a spear.

Year-long Universal Championship reign (2017–2018) 
The following night on Raw, Lesnar challenged Goldberg to a final match at WrestleMania 33. On the February 6 episode of Raw, Goldberg accepted Lesnar's challenge and was named number one contender for Kevin Owens' Universal Championship, which he won on March 5 at Fastlane thus turning his match with Lesnar into a title match. At WrestleMania on April 2, Lesnar beat Goldberg to win his fifth world title in WWE and became the first man to have won both the WWE Championship and the Universal Championship. Lesnar also became the second person to kick-out from Goldberg's Jackhammer and gave him the first clean singles loss of his professional wrestling career. After several weeks of feuding, Lesnar's first title defense came at the inaugural Great Balls of Fire event on July 9, 2017, where he successfully retained against Samoa Joe, before defeating him a second time for the title at a house show.

On the July 31 episode of Raw, Lesnar was scheduled to defend his title in a fatal four-way match at SummerSlam against Samoa Joe, Roman Reigns and Braun Strowman. Lesnar and Heyman stated that both would leave WWE should Lesnar lose the championship in the match. At SummerSlam on August 20, Lesnar retained the title by pinning Reigns. The next night on Raw, Lesnar was attacked by Strowman. The subsequent title match at No Mercy on September 24 was won by Lesnar. Lesnar then defeated WWE Champion AJ Styles in an interbrand Champion vs Champion non-title match at Survivor Series on November 19. His next title defense was scheduled for the Royal Rumble on January 28, 2018, where he successfully defended the title in a triple threat match against Strowman and Kane. Lesnar then re-ignited his feud with Roman Reigns, who won the Elimination Chamber match at Elimination Chamber on February 25 to become the number one contender to Lesnar's title at WrestleMania 34. At WrestleMania on April 8, Lesnar pinned Reigns to retain the title in the main event. Rumors arose that Lesnar would leave WWE and rejoin the UFC. On April 9, Lesnar re-signed with WWE. At the Greatest Royal Rumble pay-per-view on April 27, he again defeated Reigns in a steel cage when Reigns speared Lesnar through the cage wall. As Lesnar escaped the cage first, he was declared the winner.

After the Greatest Royal Rumble, Lesnar was absent from WWE television for nearly three months. At Extreme Rules on July 15, Raw General Manager Kurt Angle threatened to strip Lesnar of the Universal Championship if he did not show up to Raw the following night. The following night on Raw, Heyman agreed that Lesnar would defend his title at SummerSlam; Reigns became the number one contender later that same night. On the July 30 episode of Raw, Lesnar was at the arena but refused to appear in the ring. Angle threatened to fire Heyman if he could not persuade Lesnar to come to the ring. Throughout the broadcast, Heyman's attempts were unsuccessful. At the end of the show, after Angle had fired him, Lesnar appeared to attack Angle and choke Heyman. Two weeks later, the dissension between Lesnar and Heyman was revealed to be just a ruse when Lesnar returning on the August 13 episode of Raw to attack Reigns. At SummerSlam on August 19, Strowman was at ringside ready to cash in his Money in the Bank contract on the winner. Lesnar incapacitated Strowman, allowing Reigns to capitalize on the distracted Lesnar and win the Universal Championship, ending Lesnar's title reign at 504 days. The reign was the sixth-longest world championship reign in WWE history and the longest since 1988.

World championship reigns and first retirement (2018–2020) 
Lesnar returned at Hell in a Cell on September 16, interrupting the Hell in a Cell match between defending Universal Champion Reigns and Braun Strowman, kicking in the door and attacking both men, thus rendering the match a no-contest and costing Strowman his Money in the Bank cash-in match. The next night on Raw, Acting General Manager Baron Corbin scheduled Reigns to defend the Universal Championship in a triple threat match against Lesnar and Strowman at Crown Jewel on November 2. After Reigns relinquished the title due to a legitimate leukemia relapse, the match was changed to a singles match between Lesnar and Strowman for the vacant title. At Crown Jewel, Lesnar defeated Strowman in three minutes to become the first two-time Universal Champion, thanks to a pre-match attack from Baron Corbin.

After his title win, Lesnar was scheduled to face WWE Champion AJ Styles at Survivor Series in another Champion vs Champion non-title match. Five days before, Styles lost the WWE Championship to Daniel Bryan on SmackDown. At Survivor Series on November 18, Lesnar overcame a late rally from Bryan to defeat him. Lesnar then successfully defended the title against Finn Bálor via submission at the Royal Rumble on January 27, 2019. The next night on Raw, Lesnar attacked 2019 Royal Rumble match winner Seth Rollins with six F-5s, setting up a title match for WrestleMania 35. At WrestleMania on April 7, Lesnar attacked Rollins before the match. Rollins then attacked Lesnar with a low blow while the referee was down and pinned Lesnar, ending his second reign as Universal Champion at 156 days.

At Money in the Bank on May 19, 2019, Lesnar surprisingly replaced Sami Zayn in the Money in the Bank ladder match. Before the match, Zayn had been attacked backstage. Later, the match began with only seven of the scheduled eight participants. At the climax of the match, Lesnar ran in, took out Ali, who was on top of a ladder, and won the Money in the Bank contract, granting him either a Universal Championship or WWE Championship match at any time of his choosing within the next year. After teasing cashing in on Universal Champion Seth Rollins and WWE Champion Kofi Kingston and failing an attempt to cash-in on Rollins at Super ShowDown on June 7, Lesnar successfully cashed in his contract to win the Universal Championship from Rollins at Extreme Rules on July 14 right after Rollins and Raw Women's Champion Becky Lynch had retained their respective titles against Baron Corbin and Lacey Evans in an Extreme Rules mixed tag team match. At SummerSlam on August 11, Lesnar lost the title back to Rollins, ending his third title reign at 28 days.

Lesnar and Heyman returned on the September 17 episode of SmackDown to challenge Kofi Kingston for the WWE Championship. Kingston accepted and Lesnar proceeded to F-5 him. On SmackDowns 20th Anniversary on October 4, Lesnar quickly defeated Kingston in about eight seconds to win his fifth WWE Championship; this was Lesnar's first match on SmackDown in 15 years. After his victory, Lesnar was attacked by former UFC opponent Cain Velasquez, making his WWE debut. Lesnar was then scheduled to defend the WWE Championship against Velasquez at Crown Jewel on October 31. During the 2019 draft, Lesnar was drafted to SmackDown. At the Crown Jewel event, Lesnar defeated Velasquez in under five minutes via submission with the Kimura Lock. After the match, Rey Mysterio attacked Lesnar with a chair. On the November 1 episode of SmackDown, Lesnar and Heyman quit the brand in order to go after Mysterio, who had been drafted to Raw, thus transferring to Raw with the WWE Championship. This led to Mysterio challenging Lesnar for the WWE Championship at Survivor Series on November 24, which was made official as a No Holds Barred match, where Lesnar retained, despite Mysterio's son, Dominik's attempt to aid Mysterio during the match.

Lesnar returned on the January 6, 2020, episode of Raw to declare that no one deserved an opportunity at the WWE Championship at the Royal Rumble, so instead he would enter the Royal Rumble match as entrant number one. At the Royal Rumble on January 26, Lesnar eliminated the first thirteen competitors he faced, tying the record for most eliminations in a Royal Rumble match, before being eliminated by Drew McIntyre, who won the match. After retaining the championship against Ricochet at Super ShowDown on February 27, Lesnar ultimately lost the WWE Championship to McIntyre in the main event of WrestleMania 36 Part 2 (which was taped on March 25–26 and aired on April 5). This was his final appearance until 2021 – it was later reported by several sources that Lesnar was not under contract with WWE after the match. Lesnar confirmed in March 2022 that he had initially retired from professional wrestling after WrestleMania 36, until deciding to return in 2021.

Second return to WWE (2021–present)

Feud with Roman Reigns (2021-2022) 
Lesnar, now sporting a cowboy/farmer look with a beard and ponytail, returned at SummerSlam on August 21, 2021, as a face, confronting Universal Champion Roman Reigns after his successful title defense against John Cena. During the 2021 WWE Draft, it was revealed that Lesnar had become a free agent, allowing him to appear on any brand. He then primarily appeared on SmackDown, and he and Reigns faced each other for the title at Crown Jewel on October 21, which Lesnar lost after interference from The Usos. On the following episode of SmackDown, he started a locker room-clearing brawl with Reigns, resulting in an indefinite suspension by on-air authority figure Adam Pearce, whom Lesnar attacked. On the November 26 episode of SmackDown, it was announced his suspension had been lifted. On the December 3 episode of SmackDown, it was announced that Lesnar would once again face Reigns for the title, this time at the Day 1 event. The match was canceled after Reigns contracted COVID-19, and Lesnar was instead added to Raw's WWE Championship match at the event to make it a fatal five-way match. At Day 1 on January 1, 2022, Lesnar won his sixth WWE Championship, defeating Bobby Lashley, Kevin Owens, Seth Rollins, and defending champion Big E, who he pinned. On the following episode of Raw, Lesnar reunited with his advocate Paul Heyman.

At Royal Rumble on January 29, he lost the WWE Championship to Lashley due to Reigns' interference and Heyman's betrayal (who realigned with Reigns), ending his sixth reign at 29 days, however later that night, he entered the Royal Rumble match as the surprise 30th entrant and won the match by last eliminating Drew McIntyre and becoming the fourth person to win from the #30 spot (after The Undertaker in 2007, John Cena in 2008, and Triple H in 2016). This made Lesnar the ninth two-time Rumble winner, after his first win in 2003, while also making him the first person to lose their world championship and then win the Rumble in the same night. Among the other multi-time Rumble winners, Lesnar also set a record for the longest time between Rumble wins at 19 years. He also set the record for the least amount of time spent in the Rumble before winning it, being in the match for 2 minutes and 30 seconds and beating Edge's 2010 record by 5 minutes and 7 seconds. On the following episode of Raw, Lesnar revealed he would challenge Reigns for the Universal Championship at WrestleMania 38, and was also scheduled to compete in the Elimination Chamber match for the WWE Championship on February 19 at Elimination Chamber. Lesnar won the match to win the title for a seventh time by single-handedly eliminating all other opponents (Seth "Freakin" Rollins, Riddle, AJ Styles, and Austin Theory), except Lashley, who was removed early in the match due to a concussion protocol. This also converted his Universal Championship match against Reigns at WrestleMania into a Winner Takes All match. The following night on Raw, their Winner Takes All match was then stipulated as a title unification match. Lesnar lost the WWE Championship to Reigns in the unification match at the event on April 3. On the June 17 episode of SmackDown, Lesnar once again returned to confront and attack Reigns after he successfully defended the Undisputed WWE Universal Championship against Riddle, renewing their rivalry. This resulted in a Last Man Standing match being made for the title at SummerSlam, with WWE billing it as the ultimate finale to the feud. At the event on July 30, Lesnar failed to beat Reigns for the title after interference from The Usos and Heyman.

Various feuds (2022-present) 
On the October 10 episode of Raw, Lesnar made a surprise return, attacking United States Champion Bobby Lashley and injuring his shoulder before his scheduled title defense against Seth "Freakin" Rollins, resuming their feud. At Crown Jewel on November 5, Lesnar defeated Lashley despite Lashley dominating the majority of the match. Lesnar's next appearance occurred on Raw Is XXX on January 23, 2023, where he caused Lashley to lose his United States Championship match. At the Royal Rumble, Lesnar entered the Royal Rumble match at #12 but was eliminated by Lashley. At Elimination Chamber on February 18, Lesnar lost to Lashley by disqualification after he hit Lashley with a low blow and attacked both the referee and Lashley.

On the February 20 episode of Raw, Omos challenged Lesnar to a match at WrestleMania 39. The following week on Raw, Lesnar appeared on the "VIP Longue" with Omos' manager MVP; Lesnar accepted the challenged, then proceeded to attack MVP with an F-5.

Professional wrestling style and persona 

Since Lesnar's debut, he was portrayed as a powerhouse athlete. He is often called by his nickname "The Beast Incarnate" or simply "The Beast". During his initial run when he was consistently main-eventing, WWE was in what is labeled by the company and fans as the "Ruthless Aggression Era". His go-to finishing maneuver for his entire career has been a fireman's carry facebuster known as the F-5 (or The Verdict when he wrestled outside of WWE). After his return in 2012, Lesnar focused on an MMA-oriented gimmick, sporting MMA gloves during his matches and adding the Kimura lock as a submission hold. Lesnar is also known for performing several suplexes (especially German suplexes) on his rivals, with these often being described as the opponent being taken to "Suplex City", named after an ad-lib Lesnar delivered to Roman Reigns during their WrestleMania 31 match. Lesnar has been managed by Paul Heyman for the majority of his WWE career with Heyman being Lesnar's mouthpiece for storylines and feuds.

Throughout the second half of the 2010s, Lesnar began to receive an increasing amount of criticism for his character and performances. Many reporters thought his Suplex City character "jumped the shark" and his matches had "become formulaic". He was largely criticized due to his absences from television during his time as Universal Champion. It was pointed out that he had the longest world championship reign since Hulk Hogan, but only defended the title 13 times, all on pay-per-views, with Tim Fiorvanti from ESPN commenting that he had "removed the top title on Monday Night Raw from circulation". The short length of his matches were also criticized by journalists and fans. Former WWE Champion Bob Backlund criticized the fact that Lesnar used mostly suplexes during his matches, saying "it gets old to do the same thing over and over and over again".

Professional football career 
After his match at WrestleMania XX in March 2004, Lesnar sidelined his career in WWE to pursue a career in the National Football League (NFL) despite not playing football since high school. WWE issued this statement on their official website, WWE.com, following his departure:

Lesnar later told a Minnesota radio show that he had "three wonderful years" in WWE, but had grown unhappy and always wanted to play professional football, adding that he did not want to be 40 years old and wondering if he could have "made it" in football. In an interview about the NFL, he stated:

Lesnar had a great showing at the NFL Combine, but on April 17 a minivan collided with his motorbike and he suffered a broken jaw and left hand, a bruised pelvis and a pulled groin. Several NFL teams expressed interest in watching Lesnar work out. The Minnesota Vikings worked out Lesnar on June 11, but he was hampered by the groin injury suffered in the April motorcycle accident. On July 24 it was reported that he was nearly recovered from his groin injury. He signed with the Vikings on July 27 and played in several preseason games for the team. He was released by the Vikings on August 30. Lesnar received an invitation to play as a representative for the Vikings in NFL Europa, but declined due to his desire to stay in the United States with his family. He had several football cards produced of him during his time with the Vikings.

Mixed martial arts career

Hero's (2007) 
On April 29, 2006, after the final match of the K-1 World Grand Prix 2006 in Las Vegas, Lesnar stated his intent to join K-1's mixed martial arts league, Hero's. He trained with Minnesota Martial Arts Academy under Greg Nelson and Minnesota Assistant Head wrestling coach Marty Morgan. Lesnar signed the deal in August. His first fight was scheduled against Hong-man Choi of South Korea on June 2, 2007, at the Dynamite!! USA show. Prior to the match, Choi was replaced by Min-soo Kim. Lesnar submitted Kim with strikes in 1:09 of the first round to win his first official MMA match.

Ultimate Fighting Championship (2008–2011)

Debut and UFC Heavyweight Champion 
During UFC 77 on October 20, Lesnar joined Ultimate Fighting Championship with a one-fight contract. On February 2, 2008, Lesnar made his debut with the promotion in an event titled UFC 81: Breaking Point against former UFC Heavyweight Champion Frank Mir. Due to his large hands, Lesnar was wearing 4XL gloves for the fight, making him the second man in Nevada's combat sports history to wear such gloves, after Choi Hong-man. Lesnar secured an early takedown and began landing numerous punches, but was docked a point after a punch hit Mir on the back of the head. He scored another takedown and continued landing ground and pound, before Mir secured a kneebar and forced a submission at 1:30 of the first round.

Despite losing his debut, he was offered a new contract and at UFC 82 on March 1, former UFC Heavyweight Champion and Hall of Famer Mark Coleman was announced to fight Lesnar at UFC 87. Coleman withdrew from the fight due to an injury and was replaced by Heath Herring. In the first round Lesnar scored an early knockdown and went on to dominate the fight winning via unanimous decision by 30–26 on all three judges' scorecards.

Lesnar then faced Randy Couture for the UFC Heavyweight Championship at UFC 91 on November 15. He denied Couture's takedown attempts and outstruck him on the feet, eventually knocking him down and landing ground and pound until he was awarded the technical knockout and UFC Heavyweight Championship.

On December 27 at UFC 92, Frank Mir defeated Antônio Nogueira for the Interim Heavyweight Championship and was to face Lesnar for the Undisputed UFC Heavyweight Championship at UFC 98. Immediately after winning the Interim Heavyweight title, Mir found Lesnar in the crowd and shouted, "You've got my belt". Due to a knee injury to Mir, the title unification match with Lesnar that was originally slated to be the UFC 98 main event was postponed. Lesnar instead fought Mir at UFC 100 on July 11, 2009. Mir attempted to grab ahold of Lesnar's leg early in the fight but was denied and Lesnar held top position landing punches for the rest of the round. In the second the two traded blows but Mir hurt Lesnar with a knee and a punch, leading him to take Mir down and land heavy ground and pound winning the fight via technical knockout in round two. During his post-match celebration, Lesnar flipped off the crowd who had been booing him. Lesnar also made a disparaging comment about the pay-per-view's primary sponsor Bud Light, claiming they "won't pay me nothin and promoted Coors Light instead. Lesnar later apologized for his remarks at the post-fight press conference, where he held a bottle of Bud Light and endorsed their product.

On July 1 it was reported that the winner of the Shane Carwin vs. Cain Velasquez fight at UFC 104 would face Lesnar, but the match was scrapped and Lesnar was scheduled to defend the title against Shane Carwin at UFC 106 on November 21. On October 2 Lesnar pulled out of his Carwin bout due to an illness. UFC President Dana White said Lesnar had been ill for three weeks, claiming he had never been this sick in his life and that it would take him a while to recover, therefore his fight with Carwin was rescheduled for UFC 108 on January 2, 2010. Lesnar initially sought treatment in Canada, but later told reporters that he had received "Third World treatment" at a hospital in Brandon, Manitoba and that seeking better treatment in the United States saved his life. Lesnar went on to criticize Canadian health care further and stated that he shared his experience to speak "on the behalf of the doctors in the United States that don't want health care reform to happen".

On November 4 it was confirmed that Lesnar had mononucleosis and that his bout with Carwin would have to wait a bit longer and the fight for Lesnar's heavyweight championship was canceled. On November 14 at the UFC 105 post-fight conference, Dana White stated, "[Lesnar]'s not well and he's not going to be getting well anytime soon" and that an interim title match might need to be set up. In addition to mononucleosis, it was revealed that he had developed a serious case of diverticulitis, an intestinal disorder, which required surgery. After further diagnosis, Lesnar underwent surgery on November 16 to close a perforation in his intestine that had been leaking fecal matter into his abdomen, causing pain, abscesses and overtaxing his immune system to the point that he contracted mononucleosis. From the level of damage to Lesnar's system, the surgeon estimated that the intestinal condition had been ongoing for around a year.

In January 2010, Lesnar revealed on ESPN's SportsCenter that he was scheduled to make a return to the UFC in the summer. A match between Frank Mir and Shane Carwin took place on March 27 at UFC 111 to determine the Interim Heavyweight Champion and Lesnar's next opponent. Shane Carwin defeated Mir via knockout in the first round, becoming the new Interim Champion. After the fight, Lesnar came into the ring and stated, "It was a good fight but he's wearing a belt that's a make-believe belt. I've got the real championship belt". Lesnar faced Carwin at UFC 116 on July 3 to unify the heavyweight titles. Early in the first round, Carwin knocked Lesnar down with heavy punches, and continued landing ground and pound throughout the round, opening a cut on Lesnar's eye. In the next round, Carwin was noticeably fatigued and Lesnar scored a takedown, attained full mount, then move into side-control and finish the fight with an arm-triangle choke. With the victory, Lesnar became the undisputed UFC Heavyweight Champion, earning his first Submission of the Night and giving Carwin his first loss. The win also tied a UFC record for most consecutive successful UFC Heavyweight Championship defenses.

Title loss and first retirement 
Lesnar's next defense was against undefeated top contender Cain Velasquez on October 23 at the Honda Center in Anaheim, California at UFC 121. Dana White announced via SportsNation that the UFC would bring back UFC Primetime to hype the fight. In the first round, Lesnar scored a takedown and land some heavy knees but eventually succumbed to Velasquez's superior striking and was finished by technical knockout late in the round.

Lesnar was advertised as a coach of The Ultimate Fighter Season 13, opposite Junior dos Santos, with the two expected to fight on June 11 at UFC 131, but he was struck with another bout of diverticulitis and had to withdraw from the fight on May 12. He was replaced by Shane Carwin, who ended up losing against dos Santos. Lesnar underwent surgery on May 27 to help battle his problems with diverticulitis. Dana White said that he had a 12-inch piece of his colon removed.

In its May 2011 issue, ESPN magazine published a story listing the highest-paid athlete based on base salary and earnings for the most recent calendar year or most recent season in 30 sports. Lesnar topped the list for MMA at $5.3 million, which included his reported bout salaries and estimated pay-per-view bonuses.

In the summer of 2011, Lesnar announced that he was returning to action, stating, "I feel like a new man. Healthy. Strong. I feel like I used to feel". His return match was scheduled to be at UFC 141 on December 30 in Las Vegas against former Strikeforce heavyweight champion Alistair Overeem. Lesnar attempted to takedown Overeem but was unable and ate heavy body shots to his surgically repaired stomach, eventually being finished with a liver kick and punches. Lesnar then retired from MMA, mentioning his struggles with diverticulitis and saying "tonight was the last time you'll see me in the octagon".

Speculation about a return to MMA lasted until March 24, 2015, when Lesnar revealed in an interview on SportsCenter that he had re-signed with WWE and officially closed the door on a return to MMA, even though he was offered a deal "ten times more" than what he had made previously in his MMA career. He further elaborated that, while he was training for months for a return to the UFC, he felt "physically great but something was lacking mentally". Lesnar added that "[he's] an older caveman now, so [he] makes smarter caveman decisions" and that he chose to sign with WWE instead of returning to MMA because he could "work part-time with full-time pay".

Return to the UFC (2016–2018)

Fight against Mark Hunt 
Though Lesnar said he was "closing the door on MMA" in March 2015, UFC announced on June 4, 2016, that he would return at UFC 200 on July 9. WWE confirmed it had granted Lesnar "a one-off opportunity" to compete at UFC 200 before he returned to the company for SummerSlam on August 21. Lesnar dominated the first and third rounds, battering Hunt with ground and pound in the third to secure the unanimous decision win. He also was paid a UFC record $2.5 million purse. This record was broken at UFC 202 by Conor McGregor, who was also the previous holder.

Suspension and second retirement 
On July 15, 2016, Lesnar was notified of a potential anti-doping policy violation by the United States Anti-Doping Agency (USADA) stemming from an undisclosed banned substance in an out-of-competition sample collected on June 28. On July 19, a second test sample taken in-competition on July 9 was revealed as positive for the same banned substance discovered in the previous out-of-competition sample. On August 23, the Nevada State Athletic Commission (NSAC) confirmed that Lesnar had twice been tested positive for clomiphene and was suspended.

On December 15, it was confirmed that Lesnar was fined $250,000 and suspended from competition for one year by the NSAC. He would be eligible to return in July 2017. As a result of the suspension, the result of his fight with Mark Hunt was overturned to a no contest. As of January 2019, Lesnar has yet to pay the fine.

On February 14, 2017, it was reported that Lesnar had notified UFC he was retiring from MMA for the second time. On July 7, 2018, Lesnar stormed the cage after the main event fight at UFC 226 and challenged the new UFC Heavyweight Champion, Daniel Cormier. On July 8, USADA confirmed that Lesnar had begun the process to get back into their drug-testing pool. UFC officials were reportedly targeting a bout between Lesnar and Daniel Cormier for the UFC Heavyweight Championship but Dana White claimed Lesnar told him he was "done" with MMA and the bout ultimately did not occur.

In September 2020, White said he could organize a fight between Lesnar and Jon Jones if both men wanted it. That same month, Bellator president Scott Coker expressed interest in booking Lesnar to fight Fedor Emelianenko. Lesnar did not respond to either man's comments, and once again confirmed in March 2022 that he would stay retired.

Other media 
In 2003, WWE Home Video released a DVD chronicling Lesnar's career entitled Brock Lesnar: Here Comes the Pain. It was re-released in 2012 as a three-disc DVD and two-disc Blu-ray collector's edition to tie in with Lesnar's WWE return. It was also expanded to include new matches and interviews. In 2016, a new home video was released on DVD and Blu-ray, as well as a collector's edition, called Brock Lesnar: Eat. Sleep. Conquer. Repeat. and includes accomplishments from his second run in WWE.

Lesnar was featured on the covers of Flex and Muscle & Fitness magazine in 2004 and Minneapolis' City Pages in 2008. He is the cover athlete for the WWE SmackDown! Here Comes the Pain, UFC Undisputed 2010 and WWE 2K17 video games.

In 2009, Lesnar signed an endorsement deal with Dymatize Nutrition. A CD containing footage of Lesnar training was included with Dymatize's "Xpand" product.

Lesnar co-wrote an autobiography with Paul Heyman, titled Death Clutch: My Story of Determination, Domination, and Survival, which was published by William Morrow and Company in 2011.

In a 2013 post on his blog, Attack on Titan author Hajime Isayama revealed that he drew inspiration from Lesnar for the character of the Armored Titan.

Filmography

Video games

Legal issues 
In January 2001, Lesnar was arrested in Louisville, Kentucky for suspicion of possessing large amounts of illegal substances. The charges were dropped when it was discovered that the substances were legal hormones. His lawyer described it as a "vitamin type of thing".

Lesnar had previously signed a non-compete clause in order to be released from his contract with WWE, which prohibited him from working for any other professional wrestling companies before June 2010. He challenged this ruling in court. WWE responded with a counterclaim after Lesnar breached the agreement by appearing at a New Japan Pro-Wrestling show in 2004. In July 2005, the two sides dropped their claims and entered negotiations to renew their relationship. WWE had offered Lesnar a contract, but on August 2, their official website reported that Lesnar had withdrawn from any involvement with the company. The lawsuit began to enter settlement talks on September 21, but did not get solved.

On January 14, 2006, Judge Christopher Droney stated that unless WWE gave him a good argument between then and the 25th, he would rule in favor of Lesnar, giving him a summary judgment. This would have enabled Lesnar to work anywhere immediately. WWE was later granted a deadline postponement. On April 24, both parties reached a settlement. On June 12, a federal judge dismissed the case at the request of both legal parties.

On December 15, 2011, Lesnar was charged with hunting infractions on a trip to Alberta on November 19, 2010. Two charges were dropped, but Lesnar pleaded guilty to the charge of improper tagging of an animal. He was fined $1,725 and given a six-month hunting suspension.

Personal life 

Lesnar married fellow WWE performer Rena Greek, better known as Sable, on May 6, 2006. They relocated in 2014 to Canada, where they reside on a farm in Maryfield, Saskatchewan. Together, they have two sons named Turk (born 2009) and Duke (born 2010), both of whom play ice hockey. With his former fiancée, Nicole McClain, Lesnar also has twins who were born in 2002: a daughter named Mya Lynn, who competes in track and field, and a son named Luke, who also plays ice hockey. He is also the stepfather of Greek's daughter with her first husband.

Lesnar is an intensely private individual who has expressed his disdain for the media; he rarely participates in interviews and avoids questions pertaining to his private life. He is a supporter of the Republican Party and a member of the National Rifle Association, making an appearance at the NRA's annual meeting in May 2011 to discuss his passion for hunting and his role as a spokesman for the Fusion Ammunition company. He is a fan of the Winnipeg Jets ice hockey team and the Saskatchewan Roughriders Canadian football team.

Lesnar developed addictions to alcohol and painkillers during his first run in WWE, later claiming that he would drink a bottle of vodka per day and take hundreds of Vicodin pills per month to manage the pain caused by wear and tear on his body. He cited the incident in which he botched a shooting star press at WrestleMania XIX and landed on the top of his head as a primary source of pain. As a result of the addiction and mental exhaustion, he says that he cannot remember the entire two years that made up his first WWE tenure.

Mixed martial arts record 

|-
|NC
|align=center|5–3 (1)
|Mark Hunt
|NC (overturned)
|UFC 200
|
|align=center|3
|align=center|5:00
|Las Vegas, Nevada, United States
|
|-
|Loss
|align=center|5–3
|Alistair Overeem
|TKO (kick to the body and punches)
|UFC 141
|
|align=center|1
|align=center|2:26
|Las Vegas, Nevada, United States
|
|-
|Loss
|align=center|5–2
|Cain Velasquez
|TKO (punches)
|UFC 121
|
|align=center|1
|align=center|4:12
|Anaheim, California, United States
|
|-
|Win
|align=center|5–1
|Shane Carwin
|Submission (arm-triangle choke)
|UFC 116
|
|align=center|2
|align=center|2:19
|Las Vegas, Nevada, United States
|
|-
|Win
|align=center|4–1
|Frank Mir
|TKO (punches)
|UFC 100
|
|align=center|2
|align=center|1:48
|Las Vegas, Nevada, United States
|
|-
|Win
|align=center|3–1
|Randy Couture
|TKO (punches)
|UFC 91
|
|align=center|2
|align=center|3:07
|Las Vegas, Nevada, United States
|
|-
|Win
|align=center|2–1
|Heath Herring
|Decision (unanimous)
|UFC 87
|
|align=center|3
|align=center|5:00
|Minneapolis, Minnesota, United States
|
|-
|Loss
|align=center|1–1
|Frank Mir
|Submission (kneebar)
|UFC 81
|
|align=center|1
|align=center|1:30
|Las Vegas, Nevada, United States
|
|-
|Win
|align=center|1–0
|Min-Soo Kim
|TKO (submission to punches)
|Dynamite!! USA
|
|align=center|1
|align=center|1:09
|Los Angeles, California, United States
|

Pay-per-view bouts

WWE

MMA

Championships and accomplishments

Collegiate wrestling 
 National Collegiate Athletic Association
 NCAA Division I All-American (1999, 2000)
 NCAA Division I Heavyweight National Runner-Up (1999)
 NCAA Division I Heavyweight Champion (2000)
 Big Ten Conference Champion (1999, 2000)
 National Junior College Athletic Association
 NJCAA All-American (1997, 1998)
 NJCAA Heavyweight Champion (1998)
 North Dakota State University Bison Tournament Champion (1997–1999)

Mixed martial arts 
 Ultimate Fighting Championship
 UFC Heavyweight Championship (One time)
 Two successful title defenses
 Submission of the Night (One time) 
 Inside Fights
 Biggest Draw (2008)
 Rookie of the Year (2008)
 Sherdog Awards
 Beatdown of the Year (2009)
 Sports Illustrated
 Top Newcomer of the Year (2008)
 World MMA Awards
 Breakthrough Fighter of the Year (2009)
 Wrestling Observer Newsletter
 Best Box Office Draw (2008–2010)
 MMA Most Valuable Fighter (2008–2010)

Professional wrestling 

 Guinness World Records
 World record: Youngest person to win the WWE Championship (aged 25 years, 44 days)
 Inoki Genome Federation
 IWGP Heavyweight Championship (1 time)
 New Japan Pro-Wrestling
 IWGP Heavyweight Championship (1 time)
 Ohio Valley Wrestling
 OVW Southern Tag Team Championship (3 times) – with Shelton Benjamin
 Pro Wrestling Illustrated
 Feud of the Year (2003) 
 Feud of the Year (2015) 
 Match of the Year (2003) vs. Kurt Angle in an Iron Man match on SmackDown! on September 16
 Most Hated Wrestler of the Year (2018)
 Most Improved Wrestler of the Year (2002)
 Wrestler of the Year (2002, 2014)
 Ranked No. 1 of the top 500 singles wrestlers in the PWI 500 in 2003
 Rolling Stone
 Most Unavoidable Face Turn (2015)
 Wrestling Observer Newsletter
 Best Brawler (2003)
 Best Wrestling Maneuver (2002) F-5
 Feud of the Year (2003) vs. Kurt Angle
 Most Improved Wrestler (2002, 2003)
Best Box Office Draw of the Decade (2010s)
 Wrestling Observer Newsletter Hall of Fame (Class of 2015)
 WWE/World Wrestling Entertainment/Federation
 WWE Championship (7 times)
 WWE Universal Championship (3 times)
 King of the Ring (2002)
 Men's Money in the Bank (2019)
 Elimination Chamber (2022)
 Royal Rumble (2003, 2022)
 Slammy Award (5 times)
 Hashtag of the Year (2015) – 
 Match of the Year (2015) – 
 Rivalry of the Year (2015) – 
 "Tell Me You Didn't Just Say That" Moment of the Year (2015) – 
 The OMG Shocking Moment of the Year (2014) – 
 WWE Year-End Award for Hottest Rivalry (2018) –

Notes

References

External links 

 
 
 
 
 
 

1977 births
21st-century professional wrestlers
Living people
American emigrants to Canada
American expatriates in Canada
American football defensive tackles
American male mixed martial artists
American male professional wrestlers
American male sport wrestlers
American people of German descent
American practitioners of Brazilian jiu-jitsu
American sportspeople in doping cases
Bismarck State College alumni
Canadian male mixed martial artists
Canadian male professional wrestlers
Canadian male sport wrestlers
Canadian people of German descent
Canadian practitioners of Brazilian jiu-jitsu
Doping cases in mixed martial arts
Expatriate professional wrestlers in Japan
Heavyweight mixed martial artists
IWGP Heavyweight champions
Minnesota Golden Gophers wrestlers
Minnesota Republicans
Minnesota Vikings players
Mixed martial artists from Minnesota
Mixed martial artists from South Dakota
Mixed martial artists utilizing boxing
Mixed martial artists utilizing Brazilian jiu-jitsu
Mixed martial artists utilizing collegiate wrestling
Naturalized citizens of Canada
People from Maple Plain, Minnesota
People from Webster, South Dakota
Players of American football from Minneapolis
Players of American football from South Dakota
Professional wrestlers from Minnesota
Professional wrestlers from Saskatchewan
Professional wrestlers from South Dakota
Sportspeople from Regina, Saskatchewan
Sportspeople from the Minneapolis–Saint Paul metropolitan area
Ultimate Fighting Championship champions
Ultimate Fighting Championship male fighters
WWE Champions
WWE Universal Champions
WWF/WWE King Crown's Champions/King of the Ring winners